Jordan Alexander Pugh (born January 29, 1988) is a former American football safety. Pugh most recently played for the New Orleans Saints of the National Football League (NFL). He played college football at Texas A&M University. He was selected in the sixth round of the 2010 NFL Draft by the Carolina Panthers.

College career
In college, at Texas A&M, Pugh played both cornerback and safety. He played cornerback as a freshman and junior, and lined up at safety as a sophomore and senior. He totaled 221 tackles, four interceptions, 19 pass deflections, and four forced fumbles. He picked up All-Big 12 Honorable Mention honors his senior season.

Professional career

Carolina Panthers
Pugh ran a 4.48-second 40-yard dash and recorded a 40.5-inch vertical leap during Texas A&M's 2010 Pro Day. He was drafted by the Carolina Panthers in the sixth round (202nd overall) of the 2010 NFL Draft.

He was released on August 31, 2012 for final roster cuts before the start of the 2012 season.

Washington Redskins
On September 10, 2012, Pugh was signed by the Washington Redskins to replace Jordan Bernstine, who suffered a season-ending injury. He would record his first career sack on Joe Flacco in the Week 14 win against the Baltimore Ravens.

The Redskins released Pugh on October 15, 2013. He was re-signed on October 22, 2013 to replace a suspended Brandon Meriweather. He intercepted Peyton Manning in the loss to the Denver Broncos. Pugh was released again on October 29 after Meriweather returned from suspension.

New Orleans Saints
On January 6, 2014, the New Orleans Saints signed Pugh before the Saints' playoff game against the Seattle Seahawks.  He was not re-signed for the 2014 season.

Personal life
Pugh is the great-great nephew of the late former professional baseball player, Buster Clarkson.

References

External links
Official website
Washington Redskins bio
Carolina Panthers bio

1988 births
Living people
American football safeties
American football cornerbacks
Carolina Panthers players
New Orleans Saints players
Sportspeople from Plano, Texas
Texas A&M Aggies football players
Washington Redskins players